Hugh Leo Carey (April 11, 1919 – August 7, 2011) was an American politician and attorney. He was a seven-term U.S. representative from 1961 to 1974 and the 51st governor of New York from 1975 to 1982. He was a member of the Democratic Party.

Early life 
Carey was born in New York City, the son of Margaret (née Collins) and Dennis Joseph Carey. Among his siblings were brothers Edward M. Carey (former president of Carey Energy Corporation) and Martin T. Carey (an entrepreneur who owned Winfield Hall and Bogheid in Glen Cove and Seaview Terrace in Newport).

Education and military service 
In 1939, Carey enlisted in the New York National Guard as a private in C Squadron, 101st Cavalry. Later, he served as a major in the 104th Infantry Division, known as the
"Timberwolves". He served in the 415th Infantry Regiment of the 104th Division as the Regimental S-3, operations officer. Carey was with the 104th Division throughout its 10-month campaign in the European Theater of Operations, which included the fighting in Northern France, Holland and Germany. His awards include the Combat Infantryman Badge, the Bronze Star with Oak Leaf Clusters, and the Croix de Guerre with Silver Star. He was discharged in 1946 at the rank of colonel.

He received his B.A. from St. John's University in 1942. Following his military service, he enrolled at the institution's law school, where he earned his J.D. in 1951. He was admitted to the New York state bar that same year.

Career 
Carey was a partner in the law firm of Finley, Kumble, Wagner, Underberg, Manley, Myerson & Casey.

U.S. House of Representatives

In 1960, running as a Democrat, Carey was elected to the United States House of Representatives, unseating Republican incumbent Francis E. Dorn. Carey's seven terms in office coincided with major demographic changes in his district, as exemplified by deindustralization and the decline of the Brooklyn waterfront's longstanding breakbulk cargo businesses; concomitant gentrification in several neighborhoods; the emergence of a nascent Puerto Rican community; and the opening of the Verrazzano-Narrows Bridge (which spurred migration by working-class whites to the more suburban borough of Staten Island) in 1964. Although he has been erroneously characterized as the first congressman to oppose the Vietnam War (a stance actually taken by Morningside Heights-based congressman William Fitts Ryan), he may have been the first member of the Brooklyn congressional delegation to speak out against the conflict.

In 1966, he was appointed Chairman of the Adhoc Subcommittee on the Handicapped by Adam Clayton Powell, then Chairman of the House Education and Labor Committee. The sub-committee held hearings in Washington and New York City and Carey introduced HR 14. The "Carey Bill" provided, for the first time, a program of grants to the states for "initiating, expanding or improving education for children with disabilities. It also included other titles mirroring the structure of the Elementary and Secondary Education Act, PL 89-10, which Carey had assisted Powell in passing as part of the Lyndon Baines Johnson initiative.

Three parts of the Bill were picked up by the Senate: the grants to states, a new Bureau of Education for the Handicapped in the U.S. Office of Education and a National Advisory Committee. Carey's friend and mentor, John Fogerty of Rhode Island, the powerful Chairman of the Appropriations Subcommittee which provided funding for all Health, Education and Welfare programs, backed his legislation. The bill became Title VI of the ESEA, as Public Law 89-750, in 1966. Carey also sponsored and saw passed that year The Model Secondary School for the Deaf Bill, to be established on the campus of the world's only liberal arts college for the deaf. In 1965, he and Fogerty had sponsored The National Technical Institute for the Deaf, which was awarded to the Rochester Institute of Technology.

The Carey Bill and its grant program to the states began with a $2.5 million appropriation, to provide each state with $50,000 to plan for its implementation. The second year, the appropriation was $12.25 million, distributed to the states in proportion to their population. In 1975 Congress passed the Education for All Handicapped Children Bill, PL 94-142 which today distributes approximately $11 billion to the states for this purpose.

He served on the House Ways and Means Committee and led the effort to pass the first Federal Aid to Education program. He was elected Governor of New York in 1974 and resigned his Congressional seat on December 31, 1974.

City politics
In 1969 Carey ran briefly for the Democratic nomination for Mayor. He then agreed to run for City Council President on the ticket led by former Mayor Robert F. Wagner Jr. Carey narrowly lost the primary to incumbent City Council President Francis X. Smith. Then he briefly mounted an independent bid for Mayor, from which he withdrew after the death of his two eldest sons in a car accident.

Governor of New York 

In the state election of 1974, Carey became New York's first Democratic governor in 16 years, defeating Howard Samuels for the Democratic nomination and then unseating incumbent Republican Malcolm Wilson, who had assumed the office after Nelson Rockefeller resigned in December 1973 to serve on the Commission on Critical Choices for Americans. Nationally, the 1974 election was dominated by the Watergate scandal, which had destroyed President Richard Nixon's presidency and hurt Republicans nationwide. In 1974, Democrats also recaptured the New York State Assembly.

Carey is best remembered for his successful handling of New York City's economic crisis in the mid-1970s. Carey came into office with New York City close to bankruptcy and is credited with bringing business and labor together to help save New York City from the fiscal crisis. Carey managed to keep the growth of state spending below the rate of inflation through his frequent use of line-item vetoes and fights with the New York State Legislature, which was at the time divided between a Republican-controlled Senate and a Democratic-controlled Assembly.

Upon taking office, Carey cut taxes significantly, reducing corporate taxes from 14% to 10%, and capping personal income tax at 9%, and reducing capital gains taxes as well. His administration also offered tax credits to encourage new investment.  As governor, he was responsible for building the Jacob K. Javits Convention Center; Battery Park City; the South Street Seaport and the economic development of New York City's outer boroughs. He also helped provide state funding for the construction of the Carrier Dome at Syracuse University. He is also remembered for preventing conservative legislators from reinstating the death penalty and preventing such legislators from taking away state abortion laws.

Carey signed the Willowbrook Consent Decree, which ended the warehousing of the mentally ill and developmentally disabled. His vision and leadership led to the community placement of the mentally ill and developmentally disabled. He also made major strides in community programs for the mentally ill. Carey also pardoned Cleveland "Jomo" Davis, one of the leaders of the Attica prison riots.

Carey's tenure in office was marked by a growing awareness of the environmental consequences of New York's strong industrial base, including the designation by the federal government of the Love Canal disaster area. Carey made environmental issues a priority of his administration.

Along with Senators Edward Kennedy and Daniel Patrick Moynihan and U.S. House Speaker Tip O'Neill, Carey led efforts to end the violence in Northern Ireland and support peace in the region. The four Irish-American politicians called themselves "The Four Horsemen."

Carey considered running for president in 1976 and 1980. Carey's first wife had died in 1974, and Carey later attributed his decision not to seek the Democratic nomination for president in 1976 to her death. In 1978, he was challenged for re-election by State Assembly Minority Leader and former Assembly Speaker Perry Duryea. After a competitive, sometimes negative campaign, Carey was the first Democrat re-elected in 40 years.

Carey decided against seeking a third term as governor in 1982 and returned to private law practice. On January 1, 1983, he was succeeded by his lieutenant governor, Mario Cuomo.

Later career
In 1989, Carey announced that he was no longer pro-choice and regretted his support for legalized abortion and public financing of abortion as governor. In 1992, he joined other anti-abortion leaders in signing the anti-abortion document "A New American Compact: Caring About Women, Caring for the Unborn."

Later in his life, he was of counsel at the law firm of Shea & Gould. He continued to practice law as a member of the Harris Beach law firm and sat on the board of  Triarc Cos., the Nelson Peltz controlled holding company.

Personal life 
In 1947, Carey married Helen Owen (1924–1974). The two had a very happy marriage, and they became the parents of Alexandria, Christopher, Susan, Peter, Hugh, Jr., Michael, Donald, Marianne, Nancy, Helen, Bryan, Paul, Kevin, and Thomas. Beginning in 1961, the family resided at 61 Prospect Park West, a 1910 Park Slope mansion built for the daughter of Bon Ami Company chairman and Progressive Era philanthropist William H. Childs; a decade later, Carey sold the home to journalist Pete Hamill. His wife, Helen, died of breast cancer in 1974. Peter and Hugh, Jr. died in an automobile accident in 1969. Carey was devastated by the death of his wife and laid to rest any plans for the White House. Paul, who served as White House Special Assistant to President Bill Clinton as well as 77th Commissioner of the Securities and Exchange Commission, died of cancer in 2001.

In 1981, Carey married Evangeline Gouletas, a Chicago-based real estate mogul, just three months after meeting her. This marriage proved controversial and a political liability. The marriage generated controversy due to false statements Gouletas made about her marital history. Initially, Gouletas claimed that she was a widow of a single marriage but later affirmed on the marriage license that she had two ex-husbands. Gouletas also said that her first husband, with whom she had a daughter, was dead, but he was still alive at the time. In reality, she actually had three previous marriages, and all three of her former husbands were still living at the time. The marriage also caused trouble for Carey with the Catholic Church, since he married a thrice-divorced woman in a Greek Orthodox Church; the church, which does not recognize civil no-fault divorce, refused to perform communion. To an extent, the marriage also hurt his public reputation. Carey and Gouletas divorced in 1989.
Carey later described this marriage as "his greatest failure."Carey died surrounded by his family on August 7, 2011, aged 92. He was at his summer home on Shelter Island, New York.

Legacy 
On October 22, 2009, he was named as the recipient of University at Albany Foundation's Citizen Laureate Award. On October 22, 2012, the Brooklyn Battery Tunnel was officially renamed the "Hugh L. Carey Tunnel".
Building 14 at the Rochester Institute of Technology was named for Carey in 1984.

References

Bibliography 
 
 
 Paterson, David "Black, Blind, & In Charge: A Story of Visionary Leadership and Overcoming Adversity."Skyhorse Publishing. New York, New York, 2020

Primary sources
 Almeida, Linda Dowling, Peter Quinn, and Hugh Carey. "Oral History: Governor Hugh Carey Interviewed by Peter Quinn." American Journal of Irish Studies (2012): 179–190. in JSTOR

External links 

 
 
 
 "New York's Forgotten Governor"  through the University at Albany, SUNY.
 
 

|-

1919 births
2011 deaths
Politicians from Brooklyn
Democratic Party governors of New York (state)
Recipients of the Croix de Guerre (France)
St. John's University (New York City) alumni
St. John's University School of Law alumni
Candidates in the 1976 United States presidential election
Candidates in the 1980 United States presidential election
20th-century American politicians
United States Army officers
United States Army personnel of World War II
American anti-abortion activists
Democratic Party members of the United States House of Representatives from New York (state)
Activists from New York (state)
Catholics from New York (state)